Megan Ketch is an American actress, best known for her roles on film such as the 2013 romantic comedy movie The Big Wedding and the mystery television series American Gothic.

Life and career
Ketch graduated from New York University and in March 2012 was cast in a lead role on the ABC drama pilot Gotham. Later in 2012 she replaced Jennifer Esposito on the CBS series Blue Bloods as Detective Kate Lansing. Her other television credits include A Gifted Man, Law & Order: Special Victims Unit, and The Good Wife. She made her feature film debut in the 2013 comedy The Big Wedding.

From 2015 to 2016, Ketch had a recurring role in the CW comedy series Jane the Virgin. In 2016, she went on to star in the CBS murder mystery summer drama series American Gothic.

Filmography

Film

Television

References

External links
 

Living people
American film actresses
American television actresses
Actresses from New York City
21st-century American actresses
Tisch School of the Arts alumni
1982 births